William James Moxley (May 22, 1851 – August 4, 1938) of Chicago, Illinois was born in County Cork, Ireland. He was a representative from Illinois's 6th congressional district, 1909–1911.

References

External links

Politicians from Chicago
1851 births
1938 deaths
Irish emigrants to the United States (before 1923)
Republican Party members of the United States House of Representatives from Illinois
People from Delavan, Wisconsin
Burials at Calvary Cemetery (Evanston, Illinois)